Nitrogen permease regulator-like 3 is a protein that in humans is encoded by the NPRL3 gene.

Function 

NPRL3 is a human protein of poorly understood function but has been associated with cancer.

The most prominent function ascribed to Nprl3 to date is as part of the GATOR1 complex (with NPRL2 and DEPDC5) that inhibits the mechanistic target of rapamycin (mTOR) kinase-complex-1 (mTORC1) on the surface of the lysosome (equivalent of degradative vacuole in yeast) via an effect on the Rag GTPase complex.  Additionally, Nprl3 has been shown to adjust cell metabolism via the TOR pathway, and this is important for development of the cardiovascular system in mammals. Without this effect, spontaneous cell apoptosis would occur. A similar function for Nprl3 has been identified in the female reproductive system of Drosophila during times of protein scarcity.

Gene 

In Homo sapiens, the NPRL3 gene is located at C16orf35. The gene is composed of 14 exons at 53 kbp in length. This gene is highly conserved in vertebrates which is upstream from the alpha globin gene cluster. Within the fifth intron of the gene there is a regulatory section of DNA HS-40 which regulates the expression of the alpha globin. This means that the gene C16orf35 is expressed in early erythrocytes accompanying hemoglobin production.

Structure 

The human nitrogen permease regulator-like 3 protein has 569 amino acids.

Domains 

There is a predicted N-terminal longin domain within the Nprl3 protein (amino acids 4–168). At the C terminus there are three consecutive winged helix turn helix (HTH) domains. These regions are predicted bind to another macromolecule, which could be DNA, RNA or protein.

References